Giles Bush (born 9 September 1956) is an Australian cricketer. He played nine first-class matches for Western Australia between 1984/85 and 1990/91.

References

External links
 

1956 births
Living people
Australian cricketers
Western Australia cricketers
Cricketers from Perth, Western Australia